From its founding in 1847, Atlanta has had a penchant for frequent street renamings, even in the central business district, usually to honor the recently deceased. As early as 1903 (see section below), there were concerns about the confusion this caused, as "more than 225 streets of Atlanta have had from two to eight names" in the first decades of the city.

Many recent Atlanta street renamings commemorate prominent African Americans in Atlanta's history. These renamings can be identified by the use of the person's full name (e.g., Rev. Dr. Joseph E. Lowery Boulevard) rather than the more traditional last name only (e.g., Cain Street).

According to local and state rules and regulations, street renamings must have support of 75% of property owners along that street, and state guides advise against using proper names as street names.  However, these rules and procedures are usually ignored or waived, as demonstrated by the recent Ted Turner Drive at Historic Spring Street renaming resolution by the Atlanta City Council.

Name changes
Current name
Former name(s)

10th St.
Bleckley Ave. (alternative name, 1890s, Piedmont Avenue to Peachtree); Madison (between Crescent and West Peachtree)
11th St.
Harrison Ave. (alternative name, 1890s, Piedmont to Peachtree); Davis (between Crescent and West Peachtree)
12th St.
Downe St. (alternative name, 1890s, Piedmont to Peachtree); Stewart (between Crescent and West Peachtree)
13th St.
Center St. (alternative name, 1890s, Piedmont to Peachtree); Cleveland Street (between Crescent and West Peachtree)
14th St.
Wilson Ave. (alternative name, 1890s)
Andrew J. Hairston Pl. (as of April 30, 2014)
Newport Street
Andrew Young International Boulevard
International Boulevard
Cain Street (for pioneer John J. Cain)
Magnolia Street (1886 map, one block section between Marietta St. and railroad tracks)
Argonne Ave. (Midtown)
Bedford Place (Bedford Place continued south to Forrest Ave., now Ralph McGill; that portion is now called Central Park Place)
Atlanta Student Movement Boulevard
Fair Street (Pertains to the 14 blocks of Fair Street between Northside Drive and James P. Brawley Drive (formerly Chestnut Street).
Auburn Avenue (as of April 17, 1893)
Wheat Street (for Augustus W. Wheat)
Barnett Avenue (Virginia Highland/Poncey-Highland)
Kearsarge Avenue
Benjamin E. Mays Drive
Sewell Road
Briarcliff Road (Atkins Park/Virginia Highland)
Williams Mill Road (for Frederick A. Williams)
Stillwood Avenue
Bolton Road
River Road, roughly parallel to the Chattahoochee River
Broad Street
Bridge Street
Boulevard
Jefferson Street (marked in 1878 map - section from North Ave. to Foster St. (now Edgewood Ave.) in today's Old Fourth Ward)
Rolling Mill Street (north of the railroad) from the late 1860s to about 1880, for the Confederate Rolling Mill, which the retreating Confederate army inadvertently destroyed in 1864
See also Monroe Drive below
Cameron M. Alexander Blvd. (English Avenue neighborhood)
Kennedy Street (until 2010)
Camilla St. SW
 Carolina Ave 
Capitol Avenue (as of 1885)
McDonough Boulevard (for the town it eventually reaches)
Carroll Street
Factory Street (1892 Bird's eye view and 1906 map)
Centennial Olympic Park Drive (from North Avenue south to around Mitchell Street)
Techwood Drive (from North Avenue into Georgia Tech campus)
Orme Street (from around North Avenue south to Cain St. (now Andrew Young Intl. Blvd.)
Walker Street (from around Mitchell Street south to Peters Street)
Central Park Place (Old Fourth Ward)
Bedford Place
Charles Allen Drive (Midtown)
Parkway or Parkwood Drive, prior to that Jackson St.
Cleburne Avenue
Augusta Avenue (1906 map)
Courtland Street (as of September 20, 1886)
North Collins Street (for pioneer James Collins — renamed because of South Collins Street's reputation as a red light district)
Crescent Avenue
 Macon St., Old Peachtree Rd.
Donald Lee Hollowell Parkway
Bankhead Highway (renamed in an effort to revitalize and mask the name stigma attached to this high-crime section of the city)
Bankhead Avenue (Changed to honor Senator Bankhead of Alabama)
Bellwood Avenue
Mayson & Turner's Ferry
Edgewood Ave.
Foster St. (portion marked in 1878 map, from Calhoun (now Courtland) St. to just east to BeltLine in today's Old Fourth Ward)
Euclid Terrace
Kuhns Street
Felton Drive (for Rebecca Felton)
Summit Avenue
Fulton Industrial Boulevard
Carroll Road
Hamilton E. Holmes Drive
Hightower Road
Hank Aaron Drive (from Fulton Street south to McDonough Boulevard/University Avenue)
Capitol Avenue
Hosea L. Williams Drive
Boulevard Drive
Ivan Allen Jr. Boulevard (from West Peachtree Street west to Marietta Street)
Simpson Street (for Leonard C. Simpson, Atlanta's first lawyer), Jones Avenue and Alexander Street (for Dr. James F. Alexander)
James P. Brawley Drive
Chestnut Street
Jesse Hill Jr. Drive
Butler Street
John Portman Boulevard At Historic Harris Street (as per Atlanta City Council vote May 16, 2011)
Harris Street - (for Fulton County's first elected legislator)
John Wesley Dobbs Avenue (for John Wesley Dobbs, African American civic and political leader, "mayor of Auburn Avenue")
Houston Street (pronounced HOW-stun) (for pioneer Oswald Houston)
Joseph E. Boone Boulevard (as of March 24, 2008, for the civil rights activist)
Simpson Street/Road (for Leonard C. Simpson)
Rev. Dr. Joseph E. Lowery Boulevard
Ashby Street (for Civil War General Turner Ashby)
Lindbergh Drive (Garden Hills) (as of 1927 for Charles Lindbergh, American aviator; from Peachtree Road to Piedmont Road)
Mayson Avenue
Maiden Lane (Virginia Highland)
Grove Street
Martin Luther King Jr. Drive
Hunter Street, Gordon Road
Mackenzie Drive NE
Garfield Place
Memorial Drive
Fair Street (for the South Central Agricultural Society fair, which moved to facilities on Fair St. in 1850)
Metropolitan Parkway
Stewart Avenue (renamed because of redlight district reputation)
Monroe Drive (to honor the Monroe Landscaping Company which did extensive plantings in the area)
N. Boulevard
Moreland Avenue, after Major Asbury Fletcher Moreland (1828-1909), father-in-law of architect Willis F. Denny. The Moreland Park community also named after him is now part of Inman Park.
County Line Road
Park Avenue West (as of April 20, 2001)
Foundry Street and Luckie Street (south of Baker Street - formerly Thurmond Street)
Parkway Dr. (Old Fourth Ward)
 Jackson St.
Paschal Blvd. NW
Jeptha
Peachtree Center Avenue
Ivy Street (for pioneer Hardy Ivy)
Peachtree Street (south of railroad gulch)
Whitehall Street (for the Whitehall Tavern, a tavern/inn established in the 1830s)
Peachtree Walk
Centre Street (from 1895 map)
Piedmont Road / Piedmont Avenue
(Lindbergh/Buckhead area): Plaster's Bridge Road (or Plaster Bridge Road) for Benjamin Plaster who owned land between Piedmont and Peachtree around Lindbergh. Renamed Piedmont around 1915-1920.
(Midtown area): For the 1895 Cotton States Expo, Plaster's Bridge Road south of 10th street was rerouted to connect to an extension of Calhoun Street from downtown, all of which was renamed Piedmont Avenue.
Ralph David Abernathy Boulevard
Gordon Street (for Civil War general John Brown Gordon)
Ralph McGill Boulevard (for the Atlanta Constitution publisher who won the Pulitzer Prize for his anti-segregation editorials in 1969)
Forrest Avenue (for Civil War lieutenant general and first Grand Dragon of the Ku Klux Klan Nathan Bedford Forrest)
eastern portion just west of the BeltLine was Fortune St.
Sidney Marcus Boulevard
Marian Road
Seminole Avenue
Augusta Avenue (1906 map)
Student Nonviolent Coordinating Committee (SNCC) Way (as of May 10, 2010)
Raymond Street
T.P. Burruss Senior Dr. SW
Ashby Pl.
Ted Turner Drive at Historic Spring Street
Spring Street (south of Alabama — for Walton Spring)
Madison Avenue
Thompson Street (for Dr. Joseph Thompson)
Spring Street (between Whitehall Street and West Peachtree in Downtown)
Trinity Avenue
Peters Street (for Richard Peters)
United Avenue
Confederate Avenue, changed in 2018 to remove references to the Confederate States of America; minor street Confederate Court off of it was renamed Trestletree Court, after the apartment complex it serves
Washington Street
South Collins Street
West Peachtree Street
Atwood Street (alternative name on 1895 map)
William Holmes Borders Drive
Yonge Street

List of street name changes prior to 1903
On October 17, 1903, The Atlanta Constitution published the list shown below. Developer Forrest Adair had provided the Atlanta City Council this list of more than 225 streets whose names had been changed from the 1847 founding of the city up until that time. Some streets had experienced multiple renamings, bearing as many as nine different names, resulting in over 650 total names, such as:
 Haynes Street, 7th name, as of 1903, formerly named: 1) Manning Street; 2) Harris Street; 3) Booths Alley; 4) Hayden Street; 5) Markham Street, and; 6) Stewart Street
 Maple Street, 9th name, as of 1903, formerly named: 1) Porter Street; 2) Proctor Street; 3) Loyd Street; 4) Rock Street; 5) Love Street; 6) Howe Street; 7) Law Street, and; 8) Back Street

Other street origins
Baker Street (for Thomas Baker)
Cone Street (for Reuben Cone)
Ellis Street (for James M. Ellis)
Robin Street (no longer exists)

See also
Viaducts of Atlanta

References
Old Atlanta Street Names

Streets
Roads in Atlanta
Atlanra
Street names
Atlanta